Bhadrapur  is a town and municipality in Jhapa District in the Koshi Pradesh of southeastern Nepal. It lies on the banks of the Mechi River, and shares borders with Bihar state, India on the south and West Bengal state on the north. There is a border crossing with a customs office for goods. Galgalia village in Kishanganj district borders with Bhadrapur

Bhadrapur is one of Nepal's oldest municipalities. At the time of the 2011 Nepal census, it had a population of 18,164. Bhadrapur Airport has flights to Kathmandu. This airport is the best way to reach Kathmandu from the eastern part of Nepal and India (i.e., West Bengal, Sikkim).

Bhadrapur is one of the most multi-cultural cities in Nepal. In this city live people from all the districts from Nepal and who migrated from India, Bhutan, and Bangladesh. Different ethnic and religious backgrounds, such as Rajbanshi, Dhimal, Meche, Brahmin, Chhetri, Rai, Limbu, Sherpa, Tamang, Madbadi, Bengali, Muslim, etc., are living in Bhadrapur by maintaining a cordial relation, peace, and harmony among the people. Bhadrapur is the "tea city" of Nepal. It is a starting point for tourist attractions. A few hours' ride north takes one close to the Himalayas.

Bhadrapur has important governmental and other important infrastructures, including a zonal hospital, airport, Mechi Multiple campuses, different schools, Mahendra park, stadium police and military headquarters, and hosts the Central District Offices.

However, due to the construction of the Mahendra Highway or East-West Highway (north of Bhadrapur), economic activities have shifted north to the junction of the highway Birtamod. This has left Bhadrapur with a receding population and crippled its once-booming economic activity.

In the last decade, Bhadrapur has slowly transformed itself into a tea hub with new plantations and tea factories being established every year. The much-awaited Mechi Bridge joining Bhadrapur to India (Galgalia) is constructed now and acts as a lifeline to the revitalization of Bhadrapur as well as the far eastern part of Nepal. There is a checkpoint at the border.

History 
Bhadrapur was a very prosperous city during the early 1900s. It was renowned for its rice cultivation due to its rich fertile soil. This period saw rice mills being established. The prosperous rice business led Bhadrapur to its most prosperous period. Now, Bhadrapur has transformed into a major city of tea factories as the old rice mills are no longer operating.

Industries 
Bhadrapur is home to Momento Apparels, which was one of Nepal's largest exporters of ready-made garments. The factory has been forced out of operation since 2012. In its heyday, the factory had a workforce of 2,000, and supplied ready-made garments to the US (including retail outlets such as Walmart and JCPenney) and several European countries.

Education

College, +2 Level, and Schools
 National Marigold English School
 Chandra Bhanu Jyoti Higher Secondary School
 Mechi Multiple Campus
 Mechi Multiple College Science
 Bright Star English Boarding School
 Siddhartha Shishu Sadan
 Bhadrapur Higher Secondary School (est. 2002 B.S.)
 Birendra Higher Secondary School
 Araniko Higher Secondary School
 Emerald Academy Higher Secondary School
 Bibhuti vidya mandir higher secondary school
 Bidur English Secondary School
 Puhatu Janajyoti High School 
 Bhanusmriti High School
 S.S. Niketan English High School
 Pragyan Academy
 Gyan Sarovar Niketan High School
 Shree Sharada Lower Secondary School (Balika School)
 Shree Prithvi Lower Secondary School (Namuna School)
 Maheshpur Lower Secondary School
 Jiwanjyoti Lower Secondary School
 Pashupatinath Lower Secondary School
 Kalwalguri Lower Secondary School
 Saraswati Lower Secondary School
 Janakalyan Lower Secondary School
 Krishna Primary School
 Bhagawati Primary School
 Bhrikuti Primary School
 Bhanu Primary School
 Pashupati Primary School
 Gautambuddha Primary School
 Pashupati Primary School (past Maheshpur VDC)
 Mechi Primary School
 Aadarsh Primary School
 Dolma Memorial
 Greenfield English School
 Galaxy International School 
 Gurukul Kids School
 Montessori Kinderworld
 Modern English high school (estd -2052)
 Himali Higher Secondary School
 Aarambha Shikshyalaya
 HolyLand English School
 Moran Memorial School (estd-2056 )

Communication and entertainment

To promote local culture Bhadrapur has one FM radio station: Nagarik F.M 107.5  MHz. It is a community radio station.

Krishna Raj Complex has a cinema hall which is situated at Bhadrapur Bazar. Abala Chitra Mandir, which was the first cinema hall in Bhadrapur was reconstructed in the Krishna Raj Complex. Jawahar Talkies is a cinema between the Bhadrapur Municipality office and Mechi River.

Transport
Bus services from Bhadrapur 
Kathmandu
janakpur,
Dhankutta,
Dharan
Biratnagar
Birjung
Damak
Gauriganj
gauradaha
jhapa
Illam
kakaritta
lahan
Gaighat
Baniyani
Banepa
Narayanghat
Manakamana gate 
and local buses.

Bhadrapur Airport is served by Nepal Airlines, Saurya Airlines, Shree Airlines, Yeti Airlines and Buddha Air with daily flights. Nepal Airlines flies 3 times a week, the others have daily flights. The first flight to Kathmandu is at 06:30am and the last flight is 9:00 pm.

Hospitals
 Mechi Zonal Hospital  GOVERNMENT HOSPITAL 023-520172
 Om Sai Pathibhara  hospital private limited. 023-456581/456981

Image Gallery

References

Municipalities in Jhapa District
Municipalities in Koshi Province
Nepal municipalities established in 1953
Populated places in Jhapa District
Transit and customs posts along the India–Nepal border